Großharthau is a municipality in the east of Saxony, Germany. It belongs to the district of Bautzen and lies southwest of the eponymous city.

Geography 
The municipality is situated at the northern edge of the Lausitzer Bergland (Lusatian Hills), near Bischofswerda.

Villages 
Several villages belong to the municipality:

 Großharthau 
 Bühlau 
 Schmiedefeld
 Seeligstadt

References 

Populated places in Bautzen (district)